Tromsø Region is a region in Troms county, Norway.  It is centered on the city of Tromsø and consists of two municipalities: Tromsø (population: 76,974) and Karlsøy (population: 2,200).

The European route E8 passes through the region, and the Tromsø Airport, Langnes, is also located here.
In 2020 Troms county became the newly established Troms og Finnmark county.

References

Tromsø
Metropolitan regions of Norway